Boenisch or Bönisch is a surname. Notable people with the surname include:

 Peter Boenisch (1927–2005), German columnist and journalist
 Peter M. Boenisch, German theatre researcher
 Sebastian Boenisch (born 1987), Polish footballer
 Yvonne Bönisch (born 1980), German judoka
Surnames from given names